The potato candy pinwheel, sometimes shortened to just potato candy, is a rolled candy prepared by mixing mashed potatoes with large amounts of powdered sugar to create a dough-like consistency, and then adding a filling, traditionally peanut butter, and rolling the confectionery to produce a log-like product.

Despite potatoes being a staple of the recipe, the final product has little to no potato flavor in its flavor profile, which is mostly dominated by the copious amounts of powdered sugar involved, as well as whatever filling is used.

Potato candy does not require baking and is instead refrigerated in order to fully harden the candy, though it can stay at room temperature following the refrigeration process. Most sources indicate that the potato candy has a shelf life of roughly one to two weeks.

Potato candy does not have a concrete origin, though it is cited as originating from European immigrants to the Appalachian region, and became a popular Depression-era recipe in the region due to the few and relatively cheap ingredients it utilizes.

Origins of the candy could possibly be traced to recipes brought to America by Russian, Irish, or German 
immigrants to the country during the late 18th and early 19th century, though no concrete proof of origin exists and the recipe only appears to be popular in the United States.

There are numerous variations to the original recipe, with some calling for the addition of vanilla extract to add some flavor, and some utilizing sweet potatoes instead of regular potatoes. Additionally, for the filling, though peanut butter is seen as the traditional filling, it may be substituted with other spreads such as Nutella.

References 

Potato dishes
Appalachian cuisine
American confectionery
American snack foods
Peanut butter confectionery